McGuire Reservoir is an impoundment of the upper Nestucca River in Yamhill County in the U.S. state of Oregon. It is the primary raw water source for McMinnville Water and Light, which supplies drinking water to the city of McMinnville.

See also 
 List of lakes in Oregon

References

Lakes of Oregon
Reservoirs in Oregon
Geography of Yamhill County, Oregon